Basic Pain Basic Pleasure is the second album by Of Cabbages and Kings, released in 1990 by Triple X Records.

Track listing

Personnel 
Adapted from the Basic Pain Basic Pleasure liner notes.

Of Cabbages and Kings
 Richard Hutchins – drums, percussion, Chinese temple bells (1, 7)
 Algis Kizys – bass guitar, vocals (1, 2, 7), ukelin (6, 8), production
 Carolyn Master – guitar, vocals (3, 5, 7), keyboards (6), production
 Diane Wlezien – vocals, percussion (1)

Technical personnel
 Edward G. Lines – photography
 Wharton Tiers – production, engineering

Release history

References

External links 
 

1990 albums
Of Cabbages and Kings albums
Albums produced by Wharton Tiers
Triple X Records albums